Ngerengere River is a river of the Morogoro Region of Tanzania. It rises in the Uluguru Mountains, and flows eastwards to join the Ruvu River at approximately 7.05085 S, 38.51571 E. The city of Morogoro is on the Ngerengere River.

The Mindu Dam project, began in 1978, has been surrounded by controversy. The dam is being rapidly silted due to deforestation in the surrounding areas. It faces mercury poisoning from gold mining nearby and a threat to water supply.

Rivers of Tanzania
Geography of Morogoro Region